Rowthulapudi is a village in Kakinada district of the Indian state of Andhra Pradesh. It is located in Rowthulapudi Mandal.

Geography
Ravutulapudi is located in the east part of India. It has an average elevation of 150 metres (1067 ft).

Demographics
Ravutulapudi's total population is 91,400; 61.6% male and 38.4% female. About 13.48% of the population is under age six.

References

Villages in Rowthulapudi mandal